College Park East is a primarily residential neighbourhood located in the east-central part of Saskatoon, Saskatchewan, Canada. The majority of its residents live in single-family detached dwellings, with a sizeable minority of high-density, multiple-unit dwellings. As of 2006, the area is home to 4,809 residents. The neighbourhood is considered a middle-income area, with an average family income of $67,946, an average dwelling value of $314,000 and a home ownership rate of 67.2%.

History
The land where College Park East now exists was annexed in the period between 1970 and 1974.  Home construction was at its peak from 1971 until 1980. Streets are named after Canadian universities and professors, which continues the theme from the College Park neighbourhood. The community is also widely known by the variant name East College Park.

Government and politics
College Park East exists within the federal electoral district of Saskatoon—Grasswood.  It is currently represented by Kevin Waugh of the Conservative Party of Canada, first elected in 2015.

Provincially, the area is divided by Boychuk Drive into the constituencies of Saskatoon University and Saskatoon Willowgrove. Saskatoon University is currently represented by Eric Olauson of the Saskatchewan Party since 2016. Saskatoon Willowgrove is currently represented by Ken Cheveldayoff of the Saskatchewan Party since 2003.

In Saskatoon's non-partisan municipal politics, College Park East lies within ward 8.  It is currently represented by Councillor Sarina Gersher, who was first elected in 2016.

Institutions

Education

Roland Michener School - public elementary, part of the Saskatoon Public School Division.
St. Augustine School - separate (Catholic) elementary, part of Greater Saskatoon Catholic Schools

Parks and recreation
Sidney L. Buckwold Park, district section - 
Edward McCourt Park - 
Sidney L. Buckwold Park, neighbourhood section - 

The College Park East Community Association provides neighbourhood residents with access to a broad range of quality sports, recreational, and leisure programs. The association operates a variety of programs out of Roland Michener and St. Augustine schools. Volunteers also organize fundraisers, stage community events, maintain and operate the community rink, put together a newsletter and work with the City on local concerns such as park development.

A traveling skate trailer, operated by the City of Saskatoon, stops at Roland Michener school to complement the skateboard service provided at the Lions Skate Park in Victoria Park for youths aged 5 – 14.

Commercial
Commercial development includes a strip mall on Boychuk Drive and Laurentian Drive, and a convenience store and car wash on 8th Street and McKercher Drive.  All other property in the neighbourhood is zoned as residential. 55 home-based businesses exist in the area. There is also strip-mall development on 8th Street just to the west of the community boundary.

Location
College Park East is located within the Lakewood Suburban Development Area.  It is bounded by 8th Street to the south, the CP Railway tracks to the east, College Drive to the north, and McKercher Drive to the west.  Inside those boundaries, the roads are a mix of local roads and collector roads.

References

External links

College Park East neighbourhood profile - 2007
College Park East Community Association

Neighbourhoods in Saskatoon